Oneness is an album by Jack DeJohnette with Michael Cain, Jerome Harris and Don Alias, recorded in 1997 and released on the ECM label.

Reception 
The Allmusic review by Stephen Thomas Erlewine states, "Oneness stands as a welcome, minimalist and challenging effort from DeJohnette".

Track listing 
All compositions by Jack DeJohnette except where noted.

 "Welcome Blessing" (Don Alias, Jack DeJohnette) – 2:05
 "Free Above Sea" (Alias, Michael Cain, DeJohnette, Jerome Harris) – 5:54
 "Priestesses of the Mist" – 15:13
 "Jack In" – 12:36
 "From the Heart/C.M.A." (Alias, Cain, DeJohnette, Harris) – 27:32

Personnel 
 Jack DeJohnette – drums, percussion
 Michael Cain – piano
 Jerome Harris – guitar, bass
 Don Alias – percussion

References 

Jack DeJohnette albums
1997 albums
ECM Records albums
Albums produced by Manfred Eicher